Germán Vargas Lleras (born 19 February 1962) is a Colombian politician who recently served as Vice President of Colombia under President Juan Manuel Santos Calderón. A member of the Radical Change political party, he served four consecutive terms in the Senate, having been elected in 1994. German Vargas also served in the Cabinet as the Minister of Interior and then as the Minister of Housing, City and Territory.  He was elected Vice President of Colombia in 2014, running alongside Juan Manuel Santos who was seeking re-election for a second term as President. On 15 March 2017, Vargas Lleras resigned as Vice President in order to be eligible to run for President in the 2018 presidential elections. He finished in fourth place.

Background
Germán was born on 19 February 1962 in Bogotá to Germán Vargas Espinosa and Clemencia Lleras de la Fuente. He comes from one of the country's most prominent political families, with his mother being the daughter of former President Carlos Lleras Restrepo, and he is the nephew of former presidential candidate Carlos Lleras de la Fuente. Former president Alberto Lleras Camargo is also related to the family.

Vargas Lleras graduated from Universidad del Rosario in Bogota where he received his Bachelor of Laws degree. Afterwards he went to Spain to study Government and Political Science at the Ortega and Gasset Institute of the Complutense University of Madrid.

Political career
Germán Vargas Lleras began his political career while in college at 19 years of age in a successful campaign that got him elected as councilman of Bojacá, Cundinamarca, in 1981 under the flags of the New Liberalism, a dissident political movement founded by the then young Senator Luis Carlos Galán. Right after the election, Galan appointed him political coordinator for the district of Los Mártires in the capital city of Bogotá. The experience he acquired during his tenure led him to run for city councilman of Bogotá in 1988. After the assassination of his political mentor in 1989, the New Liberalism began to crumble, and Vargas Lleras, who was then Private Secretary at the Ministry of Agriculture, joined the ranks of the Colombian Liberal Party.

Once he had joined the party he retook his tasks in the capital district of Los Mártires and assembled a team that helped him get elected for two consecutive terms as City Councilman (1990–1994). He then ran successfully for the Colombian Senate in 1994 under the auspices of the Liberal Party.

In 1999 Vargas Lleras became the visible head of the opposition in the Senate to the government of president Andrés Pastrana, mainly due to the ill-fated 1999–2002 FARC–Government peace process. His staunch opposition to ongoing peace talks in midst of those circumstances, brought him nearer to Álvaro Uribe Vélez, a dissident liberal candidate for the presidential election of 2002 who was calling for the end of the Demilitarized Zone of San Vicente del Caguán. Vargas Lleras moved to support Uribe's candidacy, a decision that forced him to go against the Liberal party and its official candidate for the presidency Horacio Serpa.

In 2002 he ran for his third term of office in the Senate on the ticket of the political movement Colombia Always, a dissident of the Liberal Party, founded by Juan Lozano. He not only got re-elected but thanks to the high number of votes received, carried another candidate in the same ticket to get elected along him, with the third highest ballot count in the country. Five months into his third term, Senator Vargas Lleras was the victim of a terrorist attack, a bomb hidden in a book wrapped in gift paper. As a result of the attack, Vargas Lleras lost some fingers in his left hand. Still recovering from his wounds, Vargas Lleras returned to the Senate's floor in 2003, consolidating himself as one of the leaders of President Uribe's Senate coalition. In 2003, Vargas Lleras was elected Senate President.

In July 2005, the national news magazine Semana published a report stating that the Office of the Attorney General of Colombia pointed a man called Joaquín Vergara Mojica, an ex guerilla member of the ELN terrorist organization as the one behind the bomb-attack against Senator Vargas Lleras. The report stated  that the accused – along with two other "reinsertados" (deserters who had been pardoned) from the terrorist organization FARC, staged a plan to send explosive devices to high-profile individuals – Senator Vargas Lleras among them, to then seek rewards from the CIA by tipping them of the terrorist attacks before the devices exploded. According to Vergara's version, the bomb inside the book aimed for Senator Vargas Lleras exploded before the law enforcers made it to his office.

In October 2003, Juan Lozano was defeated into his run for mayor of Bogotá under the Colombia Always party. Senator Vargas Lleras then decided to join the Radical Change party, he rose among its ranks and in 2004 became its Chairman and Director.

In the second half of 2005 a group of Uribists led by Juan Manuel Santos founded the Party of the U, and publicly invited Senator Vargas Lleras to merge both parties looking to ensure the majorities in the following elections. The Senator declined the invitation arguing that both parties represented different political sectors. Soon after the elections, the infiltration of the Party of the U by extreme right paramilitary organizations became public, triggering a storm of indignation among many Colombians.

Senator Vargas Lleras suffered another terrorist attack, this time with a car-bomb. Vargas Lleras escaped the attack unharmed but a few of his bodyguards were seriously injured. The attack led to a confrontation between the Senator and President Uribe when the latter accused the FARC terrorist organization for the attack, disregarding leads attained by the Senator, pointing towards a possible alliance of politicians and the paramilitary organizations. The Colombian Attorney General's Office has not concluded that investigation, to date.

The 2006 elections consolidated Radical Change as a major political party by getting 15 Senators and 22 Congressmen elected. Senator Vargas Lleras achieved the highest number of ballots for the Senate (223.330) with a 50% advantage margin over the second runner up. Beginning 2008 Vargas Lleras went on a temporary leave of absence from the Senate to pursue studies in Europe. He was replaced by Rodrigo Lara Restrepo. However, on June of the same year he resigned his senate seat in a move to try to save the political reform law, in face of the crisis triggered by the fact that Lara Restrepo could not vote it for risk of being accused of legal bias. He was then replaced by Elsa Gladys Cifuentes, but regardless of this bold move by Vargas Lleras, the law did not pass in the Senate.

Vargas Lleras is cited in the Panama Papers scandal.

Parapolitics scandal
The Cambio Radical party was implicated in a so-called "parapolitics" scandal when there were allegations og ties between the paramilitary group AUC and politicians. In the wake of this scandal, Vargas reportedly "resigned from the Senate 'to study' and announced his opposition to a second re-election of Uribe, which was being led by Santos' U Party. Instead, Vargas announced to be running for president himself in 2009 creating increasing tensions between the then-president and his former ally."
 
In 2012 the "parapolitics" scandal was reported on again when Inspector General Alejandro Ordoñez announced that there would be an investigation into the alleged ties between Vargas and jailed warlord Martin Llanos.

2010 Presidential elections
Vargas Lleras launched his presidential bid on June 25, 2009. During the event, he stated that he would stay on the race regardless of whether incumbent President Uribe would run for a third term. The messaging of the former Senator has always been very clear on intending to continue with the policies of Uribe's Administration, but without Uribe.

After a long campaign trail where he visited 30 of the 32 Departments of Colombia, Vargas Lleras gradually launched his government plan, calling for a number of politically important reforms. Regardless of the offers of alliances made by a number of political parties, Vargas Lleras decided to wait for the political landscape to become clear, he became emphatic on stating that only at the right time and under the right conditions, he would be willing to participate in a coalition government.

The election was won by Uribe's chosen successor, Juan Manuel Santos Calderón. Vargas won 10% of the vote and placed third, and later became a minister in Santos' coalition in August 2010.

2018 Presidential elections
German Vargas Lleras launched his presidential bid on August 29, 2017. In a video published in his Facebook account he thank the group of citizens who launched his presidential bid through the registration of a committee to collect signatures towards running for the presidency. The Citizen committee was formed by Simón Vélez (architect expert on bamboo), Eduardo Pacheco (President of Grupo Colpatria and economist) and Jeison Aristizábal (founder of  Asodivalle and chosen in 2016 as a CNN Heroes of the year] . The citizens committee launched the hashtag #MejorVargasLLeras to promote the presidential bid.

This launch of the campaign surprised many politicians because he didn't use his political party to run (Radical Change) but instead started to collect signatures from citizens all around Colombia. A political tactic criticized by his opponents but validated by the constitution. One of the strategies that the campaign used was the usage of message to make Colombians to reflect about the situation of neighbor country Venezuela and how electing him could avoid that from happening. The strategy from Vargas Lleras to run by signatures could be a technique to avoid the bad image that his own party has had for corruption acts committed by many of his members including members of the parliament and attorneys

Vargas Lleras began his campaign with a favorable image of 41% against a dis-favorable image of 48% according to Gallup poll on August 30, 2017. The polls of July 2017 put him in the first position reaching 14% of the popular opinion if the presidential elections would be to be held according to Cifras y Conceptos. However, most of the electors are not sure who are they going to vote for reaching 17%. He finished the race in fourth place with 7.30% of the votes.

In 2019, 65% of the population surveyed said they had an unfavourable image of Germán Vargas Lleras, while 25% said they had a favourable image.

References

External links

 Official site of Germán Vargas Lleras
 Germán Vargas Lleras' Fan Page on Facebook
 Germán Vargas Lleras' Twitter
 Political biography of Vargas Lleras
 Profile at Votebien.com
 Profile of his party Cambio Radical at Votebien.com
 German Vargas Lleras profile on Colombia Reports
 Germán Vargas Lleras should be the next president of Colombia

1962 births
Living people
People from Bogotá
German
Del Rosario University alumni
20th-century Colombian lawyers
Members of the Senate of Colombia
Presidents of the Senate of Colombia
Candidates for President of Colombia
Colombian Ministers of the Interior and Justice
Colombian Ministers of the Interior
Ministers of Housing, City and Territory of Colombia
Radical Change politicians
Colombian Liberal Party politicians
Colombia Always politicians
Vice presidents of Colombia